Coleophora albulae is a moth of the family Coleophoridae. It is found in France, Switzerland and Italy.

References

albulae
Moths described in 1880
Moths of Europe